Phloeograptis is a genus of moths in the family Gelechiidae.

Species
 Phloeograptis macrynta Meyrick, 1904
 Phloeograptis metrionoma (Meyrick, 1928)
 Phloeograptis obliquata (Lucas, 1900)
 Phloeograptis pachnias (Meyrick, 1902)
 Phloeograptis spodopasta (Lower, 1920)
 Phloeograptis zopherota Meyrick, 1904

References

Oecophorinae